Emma Richmond was a popular writer of 33 romance novels in Mills & Boon from 1988 to 2001.

Bibliography

Single novels
Take Away the Pride (1988)
Unwilling Heart (1989)
Heart in Hiding (1989)
Suspicious Heart (1989)
Gentle Trap (1990)
A Taste of Heaven (1990)
Law of Possession (1990)
A Foolish Dream (1991)
Unfair Assumptions (1991)
A Stranger's Trust (1991)
Deliberate Provocation (1992)
More Than a Dream (1992)
Fate of Happiness (1992)
Love of My Heart (1993)
Fiery Attraction (1993)
A Wayward Love (1994)
A Family Closeness (1995)
The Love Trap (1995)
The Bachelor Chase (1996)
Having It All! (1996)
First-time Father (1996)
Behaving Badly! (1997)
Secret Wedding (1997)
A Husband for Christmas (1997)
His Temporary Mistress (1997)
Instant Mother (1998)
One Bride Required! (1998)
Bridegroom on Loan (1999)
The Reluctant Groom (1999)
The Boss's Bride (1999)
Marriage for Real (2000)
The Reluctant Tycoon (2000)
Marriage Potential (2001)

Omnibus in collaboration
Christmas Journeys (1995) (with Catherine George, Kay Gregory and Lynsey Stevens) (Yule Tide, Man to Live For, Mistletoe Kisses, Christmas Charade)

References and sources
Harlequin Enterprises Ltd's Website

External links
Emma Richmond's Webpage in Fantastic Fiction's Website

English romantic fiction writers
English women novelists
Women romantic fiction writers
Living people
Year of birth missing (living people)